Pinalia xanthocheila is a species in the plant family Orchidaceae.

This species of Orchidaeceae is natively ranged to W. Malesia, Indo-China. It propagates primarily in wet tropical biome, as a lithophyte or pseudobulbous epiphyte.

Description
The plant is erect, sympodial, and with a creeping rhizome as thick as the pseudobulbs which are  30 cm long by 1 cm diameter. Each pseudobulb would have three inflorescences that are arching, which bear up to 40 flowers 1.5 cm in diameter.

Taxonomy
Henry Nicholas Ridley named this species in 1907 in the Material for a Flora of the Malay archipelago, under the genus Eria. This orchid species has been moved to Pinalia, but the taxonomy is under review.

The species  name xanthocheila  refers to the bright yellow labellum.

Distribution and habitat

Pinalia xanthocheila is found in the lowlands of Thailand, Malaysia, Sumatra, and Java, and was recorded in the Philippines in a yet undisclosed location. It grows as an epiphyte at elevations up to 1,200 meters.

References

xanthocheila
Orchids of the Philippines